Sin Chew Jit Poh may refer to one of the two newspaper:
 Sin Chew Jit Poh (Singapore) defunct Singapore newspaper, published from 1929 to 1983, which the Malaysian version was split from
 Sin Chew Daily, Malaysian newspaper, split from Singapore version in 1960s (by ownership in 1975)